Beta Arae (β Ara, β Arae), the brightest star in the constellation of Ara, is a very luminous, relatively young, giant star with an apparent visual magnitude of 2.8 (rounded).

The spectrum of this star matches a stellar classification of K3 Ib-IIa, with the luminosity class notation 'Ib-IIa' indicating that the star lies part way between a higher luminosity bright giant (IIa) and a lower luminosity supergiant (Ib). This represents two of the evolutionary stages that a massive star passes through after it has exhausted the hydrogen at its core. The abundance of elements other than hydrogen and helium, its metallicity, is more than three times that of the Sun.

Rarely, this star is called Vasat-ül-cemre a Turkisation of Arabic وسط الجمر (wasaṭ al-jamar), meaning "middle of the embers." The constellation is named in Arabic المجمرة (al-mijmarah), meaning brazier/incense-burner.

Notes

References

External links
 
 HR 6461
 Image Beta Arae

157244
Arae, Beta
Ara (constellation)
K-type bright giants
K-type supergiants
085258
6461
PD-55 8100